Berkeley Station was the name of the principal railroad station in Berkeley, California from 1878 to 1911. It was located in what is now downtown Berkeley, on Shattuck Avenue between University Avenue and Center Street. The tract is today occupied by Shattuck Square and Berkeley Square. The name continued in use after 1911 although the station was no longer the main rail depot for Berkeley.

History
Berkeley Station began as the "Berkeley Terminus" of the Central Pacific Railroad's Berkeley Branch Railroad, established in 1876, two years before Berkeley was incorporated. In 1878, the railroad was extended northward several blocks, so the "terminus" was renamed Berkeley Station.  In 1885, the Central Pacific's operation of the Berkeley Branch was turned over to its affiliate, the Southern Pacific.  In 1911, the Berkeley line was electrified and became part of the East Bay Electric Lines.

From 1876 to about 1892, Berkeley Station included a small wooden depot located close to Center and Shattuck.  About 1892, the first depot was replaced by a slightly larger wood depot. In 1906, construction began on a much larger brick and stone depot designed by the SP's architect Daniel J. Patterson which opened in 1908.  This new depot consisted of two main buildings linked by a small enclosed courtyard. The north building was used as a baggage facility while the south building included the ticket office and waiting room.  The original design which included a fountain was scaled back somewhat due to the costs incurred by the railroad as a result of the San Francisco earthquake of 1906.  Although it was never disclosed formally by the railroad, the local newspapers reported that the new depot was part of a larger plan to re-route all mainline passenger trains through downtown Berkeley while extending the Berkeley Branch tracks northward from Berkeley along or through the Berkeley Hills where they would re-join the existing mainline.  This possibility was not welcomed by the community.

In 1911, at the urging of the community backed up by a ruling by the California State Railroad Commission, the Southern Pacific replaced its small wooden depot at Delaware Street in West Berkeley which, although it lay along the existing mainline, was too small, and most mainline trains did not observe it as a scheduled stop.  The new West Berkeley Station was constructed one block south of the Delaware depot at Third and University, and was as large as Berkeley Station.  The Southern Pacific scheduled it as a regular stop for its mainline trains, and thus, Berkeley Station lost its primacy.  It continued as a regular railroad depot, but was incorporated into the Southern Pacific's electric commuter system, the East Bay Electric Lines. When the opening of the rail line on the new San Francisco–Oakland Bay Bridge was imminent in the late 1930s, the Southern Pacific successfully petitioned the Railroad Commission to close and demolish the depot at Berkeley Station, arguing that since the downtown trains would no longer connect with the mainline at the 16th Street Station (the bridge line bypassed it), such a large station was unnecessary. The depot was demolished in August 1938, its function replaced by a small ticket office in a commercial building which rose in its place.

In 1972, the name "Berkeley Station" was revived as the name of the BART stop in downtown Berkeley, but was changed to "Downtown Berkeley" in the 1990s.

The Amtrak stop adjacent to the old West Berkeley depot at Third and University is currently called "Berkeley Station".  The depot itself survives, but is currently vacant.  From the early 1970s through the early 2000s, the China Station Restaurant had used the depot, having converted it in 1974 after the Southern Pacific discontinued its railroad use.  From the mid 1990s to 2007, the depot was used by Xanadu Restaurant.  In 2008, Brennan's Restaurant moved into the depot.  Brennan's closed in 2018.

See also
Berkeley station (Atchison, Topeka and Santa Fe Railway)

References

Railway stations in Alameda County, California
History of the San Francisco Bay Area
Railway stations in the United States opened in 1876
Railway stations closed in 1938
1876 establishments in California
1938 disestablishments in California
Former Southern Pacific Railroad stations in California
Transportation in Berkeley, California